Nunligran (Nunlygran) is a village (selo) in Providensky Municipal District of Chukotka Autonomous Okrug, in the Far Eastern Federal District of Russia. Population:  Municipally, Nunligran is subordinated to Chukotsky Municipal District and incorporated as 'Nunligran Rural Settlement.

Geography
The settlement, about 180 km from Provideniya is a Chukchi village that replaced a Yupik village, indeed the name is derived from a combination of the two languages: "Nunalyk", the Yupik for "having a village" and "Ran", the Chukchi word for "Dwelling". It is not clear whether the Chukchi gradually became the dominant race in the village or whether they forced the Yupik out.

The village is situated on the shore of the Achchen lagoon, separated from the Bering Sea by a sandy spit.

Demographics
The population according to the most recent census data is 360, of whom 191 were male and 169 female, a slight reduction on a 2006 estimate of 370.

Culture
The state Chukchi–Yupik ensemble "Ergyron" (lit. "Sunrise" in Chukchi) composed a song entitled Nunligran.

Climate

See also
List of inhabited localities in Providensky District

External links
Video of "Nunligran" by Ergyron

References

Notes

Sources
 
 

M Strogoff, P-C Brochet, and D. Auzias Petit Futé: Chukotka (2006). "Avant-Garde" Publishing House

Rural localities in Chukotka Autonomous Okrug
Road-inaccessible communities of Russia